Martin Ludwig (born 16 October 1998) is a German footballer who plays as a midfielder for VfL Halle 1896.

Career
On 3 January 2019, Ludwig was loaned out from Hallescher FC to Germania Halberstadt for the remainder of the season.

References

External links
 

1998 births
Living people
German footballers
Association football midfielders
Hallescher FC players
VfB Germania Halberstadt players
VfL Halle 1896 players
3. Liga players
Regionalliga players
Oberliga (football) players